Pierre Besnard (8 October 1886 – 19 February 1947) was a French revolutionary syndicalist. He was the Secretary of the Confédération Générale du Travail-Syndicaliste Révolutionnaire (CGT-SR) from 1929, and the Secretary of the International Workers' Association.

Selected works
Les syndicats ouvriers et la révolution sociale, Paris, 1930
Le monde nouveau, CGT-SR, 1936
L'éthique du syndicalisme, CGT-SR, 1936
Besnard was also a contributor to Sébastien Faure's Encyclopédie anarchiste.

Bibliography

External links
Biography of Pierre Besnard from the Daily Bleed's Anarchist Encyclopedia
Fondation Pierre Besnard 

French anarchists
Anarcho-syndicalists
1886 births
1947 deaths